The 2021–22 Serbian Cup season is the sixteenth season of the Serbian national football cup competition. It started on 8 September 2021, and will end on 26 May 2022.

Calendar

Preliminary round 
A preliminary round was held in order to reduce the number of teams competing in the first round to 32. It consisted of 11 single-legged ties, with a penalty shoot-out as the decider if the score was tied after 90 minutes. 22 clubs are participating in the preliminary round - five winners of the cups of territorial associations and teams that were from 2nd to 18th place in the previous season of the Serbian First League.

Round of 32 
Draw for the first round took place on 28 September 2021. Matches were played on 27 October 2021. It consisted of 16 single-legged ties, with a penalty shoot-out as the decider if the score was tied after 90 minutes.

Round of 16 
The 16 winners from first round took part in this stage of the competition. Draw for the round of 16 took place on 19 November 2021. Matches were played on 1 December 2021. It consisted of 8 single-legged ties, with a penalty shoot-out as the decider if the score was tied after 90 minutes.

Quarter-finals 
The 8 winners from the previous round will take part in this stage of the competition. Draw for the Quarter-finals took place on 1 March 2022. Matches were played on 6 April 2022. It consisted of 4 single-legged ties, with a penalty shoot-out as the decider if the score was tied after 90 minutes.

Semi-finals 
The 4 winners from the Quarter-finals will take part in this stage of the competition. Draw for the Semi-finals took place on 19 April 2022. Matches were played on 11 May 2022. It consisted of 2 single-legged ties, with a penalty shoot-out as the decider if the score was tied after 90 minutes.

Final

Top goalscorers 
As of matches played on 26 May 2022.

References

External links 
 Official site

Serbian Cup seasons
Cup
Serbian Cup